Asai Alohilaniokala "Alohi" Gilman (born September 17, 1997) is an American football safety for the Los Angeles Chargers of the National Football League (NFL). He played college football at Notre Dame and Navy.

College career

Gilman played his freshman year at the United States Naval Academy. He played in all 14 of the Midshipmen's games and was named honorable mention All-American Athletic Conference after finishing second on the team with 76 tackles along with five passes defended and two fumble recoveries. Gilman transferred to Notre Dame after his freshman year.

Gilman sat out his sophomore year per NCAA transfer rules. As a junior he started 13 games and finished the season with 95 tackles, three tackles for loss, and three forced fumbles, with two interceptions with five passes broken up. He was named a team captain as a senior and recorded 74 tackles, three tackles for loss and one sack with one interception, two passes broken up, one fumble recovery and three forced fumbles. After the end of season, Gilman announced that he would forgo his final year of NCAA eligibility to enter the 2020 NFL Draft.

Professional career
Gilman was selected by the Los Angeles Chargers with the 186th pick in the sixth round of the 2020 NFL Draft.

References

External links
Navy Midshipmen bio
Notre Dame Fighting Irish bio
Los Angeles Chargers bio

1997 births
Living people
People from Laie
Players of American football from Hawaii
American football safeties
Navy Midshipmen football players
Notre Dame Fighting Irish football players
Los Angeles Chargers players